Patricia is an unincorporated community in Dawson County, Texas, United States.

Geography
Patricia lies on the high plains of the Llano Estacado. The nearest large city is Midland,  to the south. According to the Handbook of Texas, the community had an estimated population of 60 in 2000.

See also
McKenzie Draw
Llano Estacado
Klondike, Texas
List of ghost towns in Texas

References

External links

Photos of the Llano Estacado

Unincorporated communities in Dawson County, Texas
Unincorporated communities in Texas